Henry Mintzberg  (born September 2, 1939) is a Canadian academic and author on business and management. He is currently the Cleghorn Professor of Management Studies at the Desautels Faculty of Management of McGill University in Montreal, Quebec, Canada, where he has been teaching since 1968.

Early life
Mintzberg was born in Montreal, Quebec, Canada, the son of Jewish parents Myer (a manufacturer) and Irene (Wexler) Mintzberg. He completed his undergraduate degree in mechanical engineering at the Faculty of Engineering of McGill University. He completed his Master's degree in Management and PhD from the MIT Sloan School of Management in 1965 and 1968, respectively.

Career
In 1997, Professor Mintzberg was made an Officer of the Order of Canada. In 1998 he was made an Officer of the National Order of Quebec.
He is now a member of the Strategic Management Society.

In 2004, he published a book entitled Managers Not MBAs which outlines what he believes to be wrong with management education today. Mintzberg claims that prestigious graduate management schools like Harvard Business School and the Wharton Business School at the University of Pennsylvania are obsessed with numbers and that their overzealous attempts to make management a science are damaging the discipline of management. Mintzberg advocates more emphasis on post graduate programs that educate practicing managers (rather than students with little real world experience) by relying upon action learning and insights from their own problems and experiences.

Mintzberg has twice won the McKinsey Award for publishing the best article in the Harvard Business Review (despite his critical stance about the strategy consulting business). He is also credited with co-creating the organigraph, which is taught in business schools.

From 1991 to 1999, he was a visiting professor at INSEAD.

Mintzberg writes on the topics of management and business strategy, with more than 150 articles and fifteen books to his name. His seminal book, The Rise and Fall of Strategic Planning, criticizes some of the practices of strategic planning today.

Mintzberg runs two programs at the Desautels Faculty of Management which have been designed to teach his alternative approach to management and strategic planning: the International Masters in Practicing Management (IMPM) in association with the McGill Executive Institute and the International Masters for Health Leadership (IMHL). With Phil LeNir, he owns Coaching Ourselves International, a private company using his alternative approach for management development directly in the workplace.

Contribution to organization theory 

The organizational configurations framework of Mintzberg is a model that describes six valid organizational configurations (originally only five; the sixth one was added later):
 Simple structure, characteristic of entrepreneurial organization
 Machine bureaucracy
 Professional bureaucracy
 Diversified form
 Adhocracy, or innovative organization

Regarding the coordination between different tasks, Mintzberg defines the following mechanisms:

 Mutual adjustment, which achieves coordination by the simple process of informal communication (as between two operating employees)
 Direct supervision is achieved by having one person issue orders or instructions to several others whose work interrelates (as when a boss tells others what is to be done, one step at a time)
 Standardization of work processes, which achieves coordination by specifying the work processes of people carrying out interrelated tasks (those standards usually being developed in the technostructure to be carried out in the operating core, as in the case of the work instructions that come out of time-and-motion studies)
 Standardization of outputs, which achieves coordination by specifying the results of different work (again usually developed in the technostructure, as in a financial plan that specifies subunit performance targets or specifications that outline the dimensions of a product to be produced)
 Standardization of skills (as well as knowledge), in which different work is coordinated by virtue of the related training the workers have received (as in medical specialists—say a surgeon and an anesthetist in an operating room—responding almost automatically to each other's standardized procedures)
 Standardization of norms, in which it is the norms infusing the work that are controlled, usually for the entire organization, so that everyone functions according to the same set of beliefs (as in a religious order)

According to the organizational configurations model of Mintzberg, each organization can consist of a maximum of six basic parts:
 Strategic apex (top management)
 Middle line (middle management)
 Operating core (operations, operational processes)
 Technostructure (analysts that design systems, processes, etc.)
 Support staff (support outside of operating workflow)
 Ideology (halo of beliefs and traditions; norms, values, culture)

Contribution to business strategy theory 
Perhaps the most distinctive feature of Mintzberg's research findings and writing on business strategy, is that they have often emphasized the importance of emergent strategy, which arises informally at any level in an organisation, as an alternative or a complement to deliberate strategy, which is determined consciously either by top management or with the acquiescence of top management. He has been strongly critical of the stream of strategy literature which focuses predominantly on deliberate strategy.

Bibliography 
 The Nature of Managerial Work (1973), Harper & Row.
 The Structuring of Organizations: A Synthesis of the Research (1979), Prentice-Hall.
 Power in and Around Organizations (1983), Prentice-Hall; .
 Structure in Fives: Designing Effective (1983), Prentice-Hall; . 
 Mintzberg on Management: Inside Our Strange World of Organizations (1989), Simon and Schuster; .
 
 Why I Hate Flying: Tales for the Tormented Traveler (2001), Texere;. 
 Strategy Safari: A Guided Tour Through The Wilds of Strategic Management (with Bruce Ahlstrand; Joseph Lampel, 2005), Simon and Schuster; .
 
 Tracking Strategies: Toward a General Theory (2007), OUP Oxford; . 
 Managing (2009), Berrett-Koehler Publishers; .
 Simply Managing: What Managers Do — and Can Do Better (2013), Berrett-Koehler Publishers; .
 Management? It's Not What You Think! (2013), Pearson UK; .
 Strategy Bites Back (2013), Pearson UK; .
 Rebalancing Society: Radical Renewal Beyond Left, Right, and Center (2014), Berrett-Koehler Publishers; .
 Managing the Myths of Health Care: Bridging the Separations between Care, Cure, Control, and Community (2017), Berrett-Koehler Publishers; .
 Bedtime Stories for Managers: Farewell to Lofty Leadership. . . Welcome Engaging Management (2019), Berrett-Koehler Publishers; .

Notes

External links

 
 audio of 2015 CBC interview (with Michael Enright) regarding Mintzberg's 2014 book Rebalancing Society

1939 births
Living people
Canadian business theorists
Jewish Canadian writers
McGill University Faculty of Engineering alumni
MIT Sloan School of Management alumni
Academic staff of McGill University
Academic staff of INSEAD
Fellows of the Royal Society of Canada
Officers of the National Order of Quebec
Officers of the Order of Canada
Writers from Montreal
Anglophone Quebec people
Academic staff of the National University of San Marcos